Julio Romero de Torres (9 November 1874 – 10 May 1930) was a Spanish painter.

Biography
He was the son of Rafael Romero Barros, a painter who served as Director of the Fine Arts Museum of Córdoba. When he was only ten, he began his apprenticeship with his father at the School Of Fine Arts. His first known works, Head of an Arab and On Horseback, date from 1889.
 
In 1895, he had his first showing; at the National Exhibition of Fine Arts, where he received honorable mention. The following year, his brother Rafael died, aged only thirty-three. He also participated in the 1899 National Exhibition; being awarded a third-class medal. It was then that he began teaching at the art school, and married Francisca Pellicer López, who was also from a family of artists. He was named a Professor at the school in 1903.

During these years, he also travelled extensively, visiting Italy, France, England and the Low Countries. At the National Exhibition of 1906, his entry, Nurseries of Love (depicting prostitution), was rejected for being immoral, but received more attention from the public than the winning entries. At the Exhibition of 1908, he was awarded a first-class medal for his Gypsy Muse. In 1912, his work went unrecognized again, but his admirers presented him with his own gold medal, sculpted by Julio Antonio. After being snubbed at the Exhibition of 1915, he stopped participating, but chose to settle in Madrid. In 1916, he became a Professor of "Antique Drawing and Clothing" at the Real Academia de Bellas Artes de San Fernando.

He strove to represent the Academia at numerous international exhibitions, but his greatest success came in 1922, when he went to Buenos Aires with his brother Enrique, to open a showing at the Witcomb Gallery. His presentation included a catalog written by the famous author, Ramón del Valle-Inclán, and was a resounding success. Shortly after, he was elected a full member of the Real Academia, and the academy in Córdoba.

By 1928, his health was visibly declining and his doctors advised him to take a long rest. Exhausted from overwork and liver disease, he returned to his hometown in 1930, to recuperate, but continued to work. He left two paintings unfinished when he died, at the age of fifty-five. Much of the city turned out to mourn.

Selected paintings

The Museum of Julio Romero de Torres at his former residence in Córdoba houses examples of his works, as well as works by Francisco Zurbarán, Alejo Fernández, Antonio del Castillo and Valdés Leal. Some of his important works at the museum include Amor místico y amor profano, El Poema de Córdoba, Marta y María, La saeta, Cante hondo, La consagración de la copla, Carmen, and La chiquita piconera.

References

Sources
 Ramón Pérez de Ayala, "Julio Romero de Torres, pintor" and "Romero de Torres en la Argentina", in: Ramón Pérez de Ayala y las artes plásticas, exhibition catalog, Granada, Fundación Rodríguez-Acosta, 1991  
 Francisco Calvo Serraller, "La hora de iluminar lo negro: tientos sobre Julio Romero de Torres", in: Julio Romero de Torres (1874-1930), exhibition catalog, Fundación Cultural Mapfre Vida, 1993.
 Francisco Zueras Torrent, Julio Romero de Torres, su vida y su mundo'', Córdoba, Ayuntamiento, Delegación de Cultura, 1974.

External links

Scholarly articles in English about Julio Romero de Torres both in web and PDF @ the Spanish Old Masters Gallery
Museo Julio Romero de Torres, Córdoba
 Biography of Romero @ Pintura Mural Cordobesa (Instituto Andaluz del Patrimonio Histórico)

1874 births
1930 deaths
20th-century Spanish painters
20th-century Spanish male artists
Spanish male painters
People from Córdoba, Spain